Many materials have been used to make garments throughout history. Grasses, furs and much more complex and exotic materials have been used. Cultures like the Arctic Circle, make their wardrobes out of prepared and decorated furs and skins.[1] Different cultures have added cloth to leather and skins as a way to replace real leather. A wide range of fibers, including natural, cellulose, and synthetic fibers, can be used to weave or knit cloth.

Humans have shown extreme inventiveness in devising clothing solutions to environmental hazards and the distinction between clothing and other protective equipment is not always clear-cut; examples include space suit, air conditioned clothing, armor, diving suit, swimsuit, bee-keeper's protective clothing, motorcycle leathers, high-visibility clothing, and protective clothing in general.

Cloth
Clothing is often made of cloth. There are many different types of cloth, with different names and uses. The main differences between types of cloth include how the cloth is made (woven, knitted, felted, and how those techniques were implemented), what fiber it is made from, and what weight the cloth is. Different types of cloth may be used for different types of clothing.

Examples of clothing materials
Common natural clothing materials are :

 Linen
 Cashmere
 Cotton

 Fabric made of cotton, flax, wool, ramie, silk
 Denim
 Leather
 Down for down-filled parkas
 Fur

Other materials are made from synthetic fibers, primarily from petrochemicals, which are not generally biodegradable. Common synthetic materials include:
 Nylon was first produced in 1935. Nylon is a thermoplastic silky material. It became famous when used in women's stockings ("nylons") in 1940. It was intended to be a synthetic replacement for silk and substituted for it in many different products after silk became scarce during World War II. 
 Polyesters include naturally occurring chemicals and synthetics. Natural polyesters and a few synthetic ones are biodegradable, but most synthetic polyesters are not. Polyesters may change shape after the application of heat and are combustible at high temperatures. They tend to shrink away from flames and self-extinguish upon ignition. Polyester fibers have high tenacity and E-modulus as well as low water absorption and minimal shrinkage in comparison with other industrial fibers. 
 Spandex (elastane) is known for its exceptional elasticity. It is stronger and more durable than rubber, its major non-synthetic competitor. It was invented in 1959 by Charles Lewis French Jr. and Taylor.

Some less common clothing materials are:
 Acetate
 Cupro
 Flannel
 Lyocell
 PVC-Polyvinyl chloride
 Rayon
 Recycled or Recovered Cotton
 Recycled PET
 Recycled bob
 Tyvek
 Vinylon
 Other Natural Fibers, including bamboo, jute and hemp.

See also
 Clothing terminology

References

External links

 International Textile and Apparel Association, scholarly publications
 German Hosiery Museum (English language)
 Molecular Evolution of Pediculus humanus and the Origin of Clothing by Ralf Kittler, Manfred Kayser and Mark Stoneking (.PDF file)

Clothing